Symphonic poem or tone poem is a form of orchestral composition

Tone Poems may also refer to:
3 Tondikter (3 Tone Poems) Wilhelm Peterson-Berger 
Tone poems (Strauss), group of works by Richard Strauss
 Three Tone Poems Charles Tomlinson Griffes (1884-1920) 
Tone Poems Michael Glenn Williams
Tone Poems (Dave Grisman and Tony Rice album)